Paleoplatyura johnsoni is a species of predatory fungus gnat in the family Keroplatidae.

References

Keroplatidae
Articles created by Qbugbot
Insects described in 1910